Huagong Station is a station on Line 7 of the Beijing Subway.

It is located in Chaoyang District southeast of the interchange of the East 4th Ring Road Middle and Guangqu Road, on the eastern side of the former Beijing Chemical Engineering 2nd Plant in a former heavy industrial area that has significant heavy metal soil contamination.

Station layout 
The station has an underground island platform.

Exits 
There are 4 exits, lettered A, C, and D. Exit D is accessible.

References

Railway stations in China opened in 2014
Beijing Subway stations in Chaoyang District